Sayed Fazlullah Wahidi (born: 1951) is a politician in Afghanistan. He is the governor of Herat Province, appointed by President Hamid Karzai on July 2, 2013. Previously, 
he served as Kunar Governor and as the chairman of the Afghan NGOs' Coordination Bureau (ANCB), a non-profit umbrella organization of over 270 local NGOs.

Education and early life
Sayed Fazlullah Wahidi was born in Surkh Rod District of Nangarhar Province in 1951. Fazlullah studied literature at Kabul University in 1973. He claims to be Sayed (Arab), and is fluent in Dari, Pashto, and English.

Social life
Sayed Fazlullah has worked in the humanitarian relief and assistance fields in Afghanistan for over 25 years.

Wahidi served as the chairman of the Afghan NGOs' Coordination Bureau (ANCB), a non-profit umbrella organization of over 270 local NGOs. He served as the General Director and Chairman of ANCB Kabul, Afghanistan, and Peshawar, Pakistan, respectively. He was also the Director of the Afghan-German Help Coordination Office (AGHCO). He continues to represent Afghan NGOs internationally as an elected executive
committee member of the International Council of Voluntary Agencies.

Political life
Wahidi has a technocratic background who is not associated with any political party, however during the jihad period, Wahidi was associated with National Islamic Front of Afghanistan, headed by Pir Sayed Ahmad Gillani.

He was appointed as the Governor of Kunar Province on November 18, 2007, and Governor of Herat Province on July 3, 2013.

Notes

External links

Governors of Kunar Province
People from Nangarhar Province
1951 births
Pashtun people
Living people
Afghan Millat Party politicians
National Islamic Front of Afghanistan politicians